USS Ampere (PCE-919/AM-359/YDG-11/ADG-11) was originally planned as a  for the United States Navy, PCE-919, and laid down as an , named Drake, for the male duck. Before she was commissioned, her name was cancelled and she was reclassified as a District Degaussing Vessel. She was later renamed Ampere, after the ampere, a unit of electric current, which takes its name from the French physicist André-Marie Ampère.

Design 
She had a complement of 68 men, and was armed only with a /50 caliber dual-purpose (DP) gun. She was propelled by two Busch-Sulzer 539 diesel engines, which produced a total , and had a Farrel-Birmingham single reduction gear alongside two propellers.

Construction
Drake was laid down on 24 November 1943, at Portland, Oregon by the Willamette Iron and Steel Works, and launched on 12 August 1944. On 20 April 1945, her name was canceled, and she was re-designated as a degaussing vessel, YDG-11. The ship was placed in service on 15 August 1945, the day after the Japanese surrender.

Service history
Due to the cessation of hostilities, YDG-11 saw little or no active service before being berthed with the Pacific Reserve Fleet at San Diego, California. She was retained on an inactive, in service, status until the winter of 1946 and 1947, when she was placed out of service, in reserve. On 1 November 1947 she was re-designated ADG-11. The ship remained inactive until July 1951, when she was again placed in service. Assigned to the Far East, ADG-11 was based at Yokosuka, Japan until sometime in 1954. After that, her home port was Sasebo, Japan. On 1 February 1955, she was renamed Ampere. The ship was placed out of service in February 1957. Her equipment was transferred to USS Surfbird, a minesweeping vessel which was redesignated a degaussing ship on 15 June 1957. She remained in reserve in the Far East until the summer of 1961, when the decision was made to dispose of her. Her name was struck from the Naval Register on 1 July 1961, and she was sold on 21 June 1962, to the Philippine President Lines of Manila. Her final disposition is unknown.

Notes

Bibliography

External links

PCE-905-class patrol craft
Admirable-class minesweepers
Ships built in Portland, Oregon
1944 ships
World War II patrol vessels of the United States
World War II minesweepers of the United States
Degaussing ships of the United States Navy